José Tomás Sánchez  (March 17, 1920 – March 9, 2012) was a Filipino cardinal of the Roman Catholic Church who held several posts in the Roman Curia, the highest of which was Prefect of the Congregation for the Clergy from 1991 to 1996. Prior to his appointment to the Roman Curia, he held several diocesan bishop positions in the Philippines, the last of which was Archbishop of Nueva Segovia from 1982 to 1986. He was ordained a priest on May 12, 1946. He was consecrated bishop on May 12, 1968, following his appointment as Auxiliary Bishop of Nueva Cáceres, and was elevated to cardinal on June 28, 1991, by Pope John Paul II.

Early life and education
Sánchez was born in Pandan town in the island-province of Catanduanes. He was the eighth of ten children born to Patricio Sánchez and Paz Tomás, who was said to be of Spanish descent.

He was and attended the Holy Rosary Seminary (then named Seminario del Santísimo Rosario) in Naga City, and afterwards obtained his doctorate in theology at the University of Santo Tomás of Manila.

Early priesthood
After an early ambition to become an engineer, Sánchez almost did not enter the priesthood when Imperial Japan temporarily closed the seminary during the Second World War; his friends from the seminary encouraged him to continue his studies. Sanchez was ordained on May 12, 1946, as a priest from Sorsogon, where he was asked to teach at the Peñafrancia Seminary. According to him, he taught Latin, Spanish and, because no one else could ably teach the subjects, Geometry and Algebra. He was appointed Auxiliary Bishop of Nueva Caceres on February 5, 1968, at 47 years old, and became Titular Bishop of Lesvi.

Episcopacy

Bishop of Lucena
On December 13, 1971, he was appointed Coadjutor Bishop of Lucena with the right to succeed as Bishop of Lucena upon the see's vacancy, which he did on September 25, 1976, at age 56.

Archbishop of Nueva Segovia
On June 12, 1982, he was appointed by Pope John Paul II as Archbishop of Nueva Segovia, succeeding Most Rev. Juan C. Sison. He resigned from the seat on March 22, 1986, due to his appointment to the Roman Curia as Secretary of the Congregation for the Evangelization of Peoples.

Roman Curia and cardinalate
On October 30, 1985, he was appointed to the Roman Curia as Secretary of the Congregation for the Evangelization of Peoples. On June 28, 1991, he was elevated by Pope John Paul II to the College of Cardinals as Cardinal-Deacon of San Pio V a Villa Carpegna. On July 1, 1991, he was also appointed Prefect of the Congregation for the Clergy and President of the Administration of the Patrimony of the Apostolic See. He retired as Prefect on June 15, 1996. He was elevated to Cardinal-Priest after 10 years on February 26, 2002.

Return to the Philippines and death
Sánchez returned to the Philippines in December 2010, ostensibly to fight the Reproductive Health Bill, which he believed will destroy the Filipino family due to the promotion of extramarital sex and premarital sex that comes with the distribution of contraceptives.

"His constant prayer was that Europe’s loss of its Christian faith would never happen in the Philippines," wrote former Senator Francisco Tatad. "And he would contribute his last strength to the fight of the Filipino family against the  international reproductive health lobby, which has destroyed the family and killed the Christian faith in many parts of the world."

Cardinal Sánchez died on March 9, 2012, at the age of 91 due to multiple organ failure and 8 days before his 92nd birthday, making him the Philippines' longest living Cardinal.

References

External links
Vatican Cardinal Bio
Cardinal Sanchez bio
 https://web.archive.org/web/20120325092035/http://www.bicolmail.com/issue/2012/mar22/xjose.html Bicol Mail

 
 

 
 

 
 

1920 births
2012 deaths
People from Catanduanes
Filipino cardinals
Bicolano people
20th-century Roman Catholic archbishops in the Philippines
University of Santo Tomas alumni
Prefects of the Congregation for the Clergy
Cardinals created by Pope John Paul II
Roman Catholic bishops of Lucena
Roman Catholic archbishops of Nueva Segovia